Dumitru Radu (born 3 March 1988, in Ceadîr-Lunga, Moldavian SSR) is a Moldavian football goalkeeper who plays for Lordswood FC Reserves.

Club statistics
Total matches played in Moldavian First League: 12 matches - 3 clean sheets

References

External links

1988 births
Moldovan footballers
Living people
Association football goalkeepers
FC Saxan players